Pida  is a genus of moths in the subfamily Lymantriinae. The genus was erected by Francis Walker in 1865, and including members of the former genus Ramadra.

Species
Pida albostriata (Hampson, [1893])
Pida apicalis Walker, 1865
Pida calligramma (Walker, 1865)
Pida decolorata (Walker, 1869)
Pida dianensis Chao, 1985
Pida flavopica Chao, 1985
Pida minensis Chao, 1985
Pida patrana (Moore, 1859)
Pida pica Chao, 1985
Pida pilodes (Collenette, 1935)
Pida postalba Wileman, 1910
Pida rufa Chao, 1987
Pida yunnana (Collenette, 1951)

References

Lymantriinae